Lajla Përnaska was a member of the Assembly of the Republic of Albania for the Democratic Party of Albania during the year 2005 - 2013. She was elected in the  Tiranë County.

She studied Pediatrics in the University of Tirana and later she specialised in Paris Descartes University and Henri Poincaré University in France.
She was elected an MP on the general elections of 2005 from the Tiranë County. She was a member of  the Committee on Foreign Policy and the Committee on Labour, Social Affairs and Health.

References

Year of birth missing (living people)
Living people
Democratic Party of Albania politicians
21st-century Albanian politicians
21st-century Albanian women politicians
Members of the Parliament of Albania
Women members of the Parliament of Albania